Robert Anthony Stock (born November 21, 1989) is an American professional baseball pitcher in the Milwaukee Brewers organization. He has also played in Major League Baseball (MLB) for the San Diego Padres, Boston Red Sox, Chicago Cubs, and New York Mets and in the KBO League for the Doosan Bears. He is pitching for the Israeli national baseball team in the 2023 World Baseball Classic.

The St. Louis Cardinals selected Stock in the second round of the 2009 MLB draft as a catcher. After transitioning into a pitcher, Stock made his MLB debut in 2018 with the Padres. After playing for San Diego in 2019, he played for the Red Sox in 2020 and the Cubs and Mets in 2021, before joining Doosan in the 2022 season.

Early life
Stock was born in Bellevue, Washington, grew up in Agoura Hills, California and Westlake Village, California. He is Jewish, and grew up attending temple and Hebrew school.  His parents are Gregg (an engineer) and Randi Stock. He has two brothers, Richard (also a professional baseball player, who has played in the Cleveland Indians organization, as well as in the independent American Association of Independent Professional Baseball and Can-Am League) and Jacob, and two sisters, Sasha and Sabina.

As a 12-year-old, Stock was throwing an  fastball. In 2002, he threw a no-hitter to lead Agoura to an 11–1 victory over Taiwan in the Pony Baseball's Bronco League World Series (ages 11–12) championship game. Baseball America rated him as the best baseball player of his age in the country when he was 13 years old in 2003 and again in 2004 and 2005.  Stock played for the United States junior national baseball team in 2004 (as the team's youngest player ever and number one pitcher) and 2005.

Amateur career
Stock attended Agoura High School in Agoura Hills, and played for the school's Agoura High Chargers baseball team as a cleanup-batting catcher and a pitcher. In 2003, his sophomore season, he had a .405 batting average with eight home runs, and as a pitcher, he had a 5–1 win–loss record with a 2.85 earned run average (ERA). as batters hit .190 against him. In 2004, his junior year, he batted .456 with  six home runs and 25 runs batted in (RBIs) and caught 70 percent of would-be basestealers. He also had a 5–3 win–loss record and a 2.69 earned run average (ERA) as a pitcher, as his fastball reached  and batters hit .218 against him. He was named Baseball Americas 2005 Youth Player of the Year at 15 years of age (the first time the award was won by a high school underclassman), Los Angeles Times Player of the Year, and All-California Interscholastic Federation (CIF) First Team as he developed a reputation for hitting 400-foot home runs with wood bats. He graduated from Agoura a year early, an honor student with a 3.8 GPA and a 1410 SAT score.

Stock passed up what some felt was a certain first-round selection in the 2007 MLB draft, to instead enroll a year early at the age of 16, in the University of Southern California (USC) in its Resident Honors Program, which allows 30 high school students to enroll a year early, the first athlete to do so in USC history. He began college while he was still wearing braces. He played college baseball for the USC Trojans as a catcher and a pitcher. In three years at USC, Stock had a .263 career batting average, threw out 33.8% of baserunners, and as a pitcher (and sometimes closer, sometimes starter) was 8–7 with a 3.38 ERA and nine saves as opponents batted .228 against him. In the summers of 2007 (as the youngest player in the league) and 2008 he played for the Cotuit Kettleers of the Cape Cod Baseball League, where both seasons he was an All Star.

Professional career

St. Louis Cardinals
The St. Louis Cardinals selected Stock in the second round, with the 67th overall selection, of the 2009 MLB draft, and he signed for a  $525,000 signing bonus. In 2009, as a 19-year-old he was both a Topps Short-Season/Rookie All-Star and an Appalachian League All-Star at catcher, as he batted .322/.386/.550 with 7 home runs (tied for third among 2009 Cardinals draft picks) for the Johnson City Cardinals. Baseball America rated him the 10th-best prospect in the Cardinals organization. He played as a catcher until 2011, batting .241 in 680 at bats.

In 2012 with the Single-A Quad Cities River Bandits, Stock pitched in 38 games, recording a 5–2 record and 4.56 ERA.

In 2013, the Cardinals transitioned Stock into a full-time pitcher. In 2013, with the Peoria Chiefs in the Midwest League he was 0–1 with a 2.30 ERA, and with the Palm Beach Cardinals in the Florida State League he was 2–0 with a 4.37 ERA. He pitched to a 2–3 record and 4.12 ERA in 35 games split between Peoria and Palm Beach in 2014. The Cardinals released him on December 20, 2014.

Houston Astros and Pittsburgh Pirates
On March 9, 2015, Stock signed a minor league deal with the Houston Astros organization. He was released by the club on March 31, 2015. On May 4, 2015, Stock signed a minor league deal with the Pittsburgh Pirates organization. He finished 2015 in the Pirates minor leagues, playing for the GCL Pirates, Bradenton Marauders, and Altoona Curve. He elected free agency on November 6, 2015.

New Jersey Jackals
In 2016, Stock signed to play for the New Jersey Jackals of the Can-Am League, an independent baseball league, for whom he was 1–2 with a 2.85 ERA in 60 innings over 52 games (a league record). He said he never thought about quitting, not when he was released or even when he was playing independent baseball in New Jersey. Stock said: “Mostly because what else is there that’s better than playing baseball? I played a year of independent baseball, and that’s about as low on the totem pole as you can get but it was one of the best times I’ve had playing baseball. There was no thought about stopping." He recalled that "One offseason, I was living in my parents' basement and I was playing video games and my mother said, 'Go out and do something," and I said, 'Mom, relax. I'm going to play in the Major Leagues someday.'"

Cincinnati Reds
Stock signed with the Cincinnati Reds organization on March 21, 2017. Between the High-A Daytona Tortugas and the Double-A Pensacola Blue Wahoos, Stock was 9–5 with a 2.82 ERA in 70 innings in 41 games. He elected free agency on November 6, 2017.

San Diego Padres
The San Diego Padres signed Stock to a minor league contract before the 2018 season on November 27, 2017, with a non-roster invitation to spring training included. In spring training, his fastball reached 100 mph. Stock began the 2018 season playing for the San Antonio Missions of the Class AA Texas League, and received a midseason promotion to the El Paso Chihuahuas of the Class AAA Pacific Coast League. Between the two teams in 2018, before he was called up to the major leagues, he was 1–0 with 9 saves and a 1.69 ERA in 32 relief appearances over  innings, in which he gave up 22 hits and struck out 42 batters (averaging 10.2 strikeouts per 9 innings).

The San Diego Padres promoted Stock to the major leagues on June 24, 2018, and he made his major league debut that day at 28 years of age, nine years after he was drafted as a catcher. For the 2018 season he was 1–1 with a 2.50 ERA in 32 relief appearances over  innings, in which he struck out 38 batters. He threw 11 of the 12 fastest pitches by San Diego pitchers in 2018. In 2018, he had the second-lowest swing rate for his in-strike-zone sliders of any pitcher in baseball (43.1%), behind only Aroldis Chapman (42.5%).

In the minor leagues in 2019, pitching 25 games for the El Paso Chihuahuas in the Class AAA Pacific Coast League and 2 games for the AZL Padres in Arizona League, he was a combined 3–0 with a 3.86 ERA as he struck out 45 batters in  innings (averaging 13.4 strikeouts per 9 innings).

In 2019 with the Padres, Stock was 1–0 in ten relief appearances with a 10.13 ERA, as he struck out 15 batters in  innings (averaging 12.7 strikeouts per 9 innings). He regularly reaches  with his fastball. His season ended three months early, as he suffered a right biceps strain. During the season, he threw a four-seam fastball that averaged 98 mph, an 83 mph slider, and an 85 mph changeup.

On October 30, 2019, Stock was claimed off waivers by the Philadelphia Phillies. He was designated for assignment on July 23, 2020.

Boston Red Sox
On July 26, 2020, Stock was claimed off waivers by the Boston Red Sox. He made his first appearance for the Red Sox on August 11, pitching a scoreless  innings against the Tampa Bay Rays. He was optioned to, and recalled from, Boston's alternate training site several times during August and September. Overall with the 2020 Red Sox, Stock appeared in 10 games, all in relief, compiling an 0–1 record with 4.73 ERA and 14 strikeouts in  innings pitched. On November 25, 2020, Stock was designated for assignment.

Chicago Cubs
On December 2, 2020, Stock was claimed off waivers by the Chicago Cubs. On February 28, 2021, Stock was designated for assignment by the Cubs. On March 3, Stock cleared waivers and was outrighted to Triple-A and invited to Spring Training as a non-roster invitee. On June 16, Stock was selected to the active roster. Stock was optioned to Iowa on June 17 after allowing 5 runs in 4 innings against the New York Mets, struggling with command and walking 6. On June 20, Stock was designated for assignment by Chicago.

New York Mets
On June 22, 2021, Stock was claimed off waivers by the New York Mets and optioned to the TripleA Syracuse Mets. 
On July 7, 2021, Stock started the second game of a double-header against the Brewers for the Mets, pitching the first four innings. Stock was placed on the 60-day injured list on July 23 after suffering a right hamstring strain. Stock made 3 starts for the Mets, going 0–2 with an 8.00 ERA and 9 strikeouts. On October 29, Stock elected free agency.

Doosan Bears
On January 4, 2022, Stock signed a one-year, up to $700,000 contract with the Doosan Bears of the KBO League. Stock started 29 games for Doosan in 2022, logging a 9–10 record and 3.60 ERA with 138 strikeouts covering 165.0 innings pitched. He became a free agent after the 2022 season.

Milwaukee Brewers
On January 26, 2023, Stock signed a minor league contract with the Milwaukee Brewers organization.

Team Israel

Stock will play for Team Israel in the 2023 World Baseball Classic, to be held in Miami starting during March 11–15. He will be playing for Team Israel manager Ian Kinsler, and alongside two-time All Star outfielder Joc Pederson, starting pitcher Dean Kremer, and others.

Personal life
Stock is married to Sara Stock (nee Krutewicz), whom he met on a blind date when she was on spring break in Palm Beach during the same time that Stock was in the area for Cardinals spring training.

See also
List of select Jewish baseball players

References

External links

1989 births
Altoona Curve players
Baseball players from California
Boston Red Sox players
Bradenton Marauders players
Charros de Jalisco players
Chicago Cubs players
Cotuit Kettleers players
Daytona Tortugas players
El Paso Chihuahuas players
Gulf Coast Pirates players
Jewish American baseball players
Jewish Major League Baseball players
Johnson City Cardinals players
Living people
Major League Baseball pitchers
New Jersey Jackals players
New York Mets players
Palm Beach Cardinals players
Pensacola Blue Wahoos players
People from Agoura Hills, California
People from Westlake Village, California
Peoria Chiefs players
Quad Cities River Bandits players
San Antonio Missions players
San Diego Padres players
Sportspeople from Bellevue, Washington
USC Trojans baseball players
Syracuse Mets players
American expatriate baseball players in Mexico
21st-century American Jews
2023 World Baseball Classic players